Bulgari (stylized as BVLGARI) is an Italian luxury fashion house founded in 1884 and known for its jewellery, watches, fragrances, accessories, and leather goods.

While the majority of design, production and marketing is overseen and executed by Bulgari, the company does, at times, partner with other entities. For example, Bulgari eyewear is produced through a licensing agreement with Luxottica, and Bulgari formed a joint venture with Marriott International in 2001 to launch its hotel brand, Bulgari Hotels & Resorts, a collection of properties and resort destinations around the world.

Currently part of the LVMH Group, Bulgari was founded in the region of Epirus, Greece, in 1884 by the silversmith Sotirios Boulgaris (Greek: Σωτήριος Βούλγαρης, Italian: Sotirio Bulgari) as a single jewellery shop that has, over the years, become an international brand. The company has evolved into a player in the luxury market, with an established and growing network of stores.

Etymology
The trademark is usually written BVLGARI in the classical Latin alphabet, and it is derived from the surname of the company's founder, Sotirios Voulgaris (1857–1932). Voulgaris is a Greek surname.

Logo
The BVLGARI logo was used for the first time in 1934, when its gilded brass letters graced the central doorway of the Via Condotti flagship store. In reference to ancient Rome, the "U" was replaced with the letter "V". Since then, the trademark is stylized BVLGARI in the classical Latin alphabet.

History

From its origins through the 1940s 
The Voulgaris were a silversmithing family from the Epirus region of Greece. Whether or not the Voulgaris family of Corfu and the Voulgaris family of the Italian jewelers Bulgari from Epirus share the same paternal line is unclear, but Count Stefanos Voulgaris denied that the Bulgari family of the Italian jewelers family is genealogically related to the Voulgaris family of Corfu. According to chronicles of the Voulgaris family written in Venetian Corfu, the "Voulgaris family of Saint Spyridon of Corfu" descend from the royal figures of "barbarian" peoples, as Greeks used to call everybody who is not Christianized, from the Volga river, who "finally settled in Moesia near the Balkan – Haemus mountains, located in Bulgaria", so the founding father of this family was described as a descendant of Prince Stefan Lazarević in the 16th century testament of the family, becoming such by taking refugee in the Venetian island Corfu.

The founder of the Bulgari brand is Sotirios Voulgaris, who was born in March 1857 and came from the Epirus Village of Paramythia, the largest Vlachophone center of silversmithing in the Balkans. He was one of eleven children of his father Georgios Voulgaris (1823–1889) and his Vlachophone Greek mother Eleni Strouggari. In 1881, Sotirios Bulgari moved to Rome and, in 1884, opened his first store on via Sistina 85. In 1888, he married Aromanian Eleni Basio with whom he had six children: Constantine-Georgios (1889–1973), Leonidas-Georgios (1890–1966), Maria-Athena (1891–1976), Sofia (1893–1908), Alexandra (1895–1984) and Spyridon (1897–1932); Leonidas-Georgios is the father of the current chairman of the company, Paolo Bulgari. In 1905, he unveiled the Via Condotti shop that would become the company's flagship.  In its early years, Bulgari was known for silver pieces that borrowed elements from Byzantine and Islamic art, combining them with floral motifs. At the time, Paris was the apex of fashion and creativity, and its trends influenced Sotirio's designs for decades: jewels of the early 20s were characterised by platinum Art Deco settings while those of the 30s featured geometric diamond motifs—sometimes set in combination with coloured gemstones. Convertible jewels were also popular during the time, and one of Bulgari's major piece was the Trombino, a small trumpet-shaped ring.

In 1932 Sotirio died, leaving the business to his two sons, Giorgio (1890–1966) and Costantino (1889–1973), who each had a keen interest in precious stones and jewels. During the Second World War, most new jewellery was crafted out of gold, as gems were scarce, and designs became more natural feeling. As the 1940s came to a close, Bulgari introduced Serpenti bracelet-watches.

1950s and 1960s: Colour revolution and Dolce Vita 
In the 1950s, some of Bulgari best-known clients included Elizabeth Taylor, Anna Magnani, Ingrid Bergman and Gina Lollobrigida as Rome earned a reputation as "Hollywood on the Tiber" with the Cinecittà studios.

At the same time, Bulgari went to a new style. The post-war boom saw a return to precious materials, particularly white metals covered in diamonds. In the 1950s, Bulgari launched its first floral brooches—called en tremblant because of their trembling diamond corollas. At the end of the 1950s, Bulgari began to establish its motifs, introducing structured, symmetrical shapes in yellow gold set with brilliant gems—chosen for their colour rather than intrinsic value. Among these multi-hued jewels, cabochon cuts were another innovation. These new pieces were a significant departure from classical Parisian design.
After Giorgio's death in 1966, his son Gianni led the company as co-chief executive with his cousin Marina.

1970s: Eclectic creativity and global expansion 
During the 1970s, Bulgari stores opened in New York, Geneva, Monte Carlo and Paris. This era marks the beginning of the Group's international expansion, with Gianni as chairman and CEO. A number of new motifs made their debut as well—jewels became recognisable for their angular forms, strong colours, oval elements with cabochons, chains and maxi sautoirs, whilst the predominant use of yellow gold made precious pieces feel all the more wearable, and became known as a Bulgari trademark. In 1977, Bulgari entered the world of horlogerie with the launch of the BVLGARI BVLGARI watch. At the time, Gianni led a complete overhaul of the company, focusing on product design.

1980s: Prêt-à-porter jewellery 
In the early 1980s, to oversee all production of Bulgari watches, Bulgari Time was founded in Switzerland. In 1984, Paolo and Nicola Bulgari, Giorgio's sons, became chairman and vice-chairman, respectively, while their nephew, Francesco Trapani, became chief executive officer.  In 1985, Gianni resigned as CEO and in 1987, he left the family business after selling his one-third stake in the company to his brothers Nicola and Paolo.

From the 1990s to the new millennium 
Bulgari diversified its brand in 1993 with the launch of its first fragrance, Eau Parfumée au The Vert and the founding of Bulgari Parfums in Switzerland to oversee the creation and production of all perfumes. In 1995, Bulgari pushed ahead with an aggressive programme for growth, becoming listed on the Milan Stock Exchange for the first time. In 1996, the brand launched its first accessories collection, beginning with silk scarves before developing a range of leather accessories and eyewear. In 1999, the brand launched the B.zero1 ring.

The company has seen 150% revenue growth between 1997 and 2003. Bvlgari continues to build up many brands which has made them one of the most profitable luxury brands in the jewelry industry.

21st century 
The year 2000 was the beginning of an increasingly aggressive period of verticalization for Bulgari, with the acquisition of the luxury watchmaking brands Daniel Roth and Gérald Genta, followed by the takeover of the jewellery firm Crova and of other companies that specialised in leather goods and watchmaking. The opening of the first Bulgari Hotel in Milan in 2004 further confirmed the expansion strategy of the brand, and was the result of a joint venture with Luxury Group, a division of Marriott International. In 2009, Bulgari celebrated its 125th anniversary with a retrospective of the brand's history, held in Rome at Palazzo delle Esposizioni. That same year, the snake—a motif that appeared in Bulgari collections from the 1960s—re-emerged as the emblem of the Serpenti collection.

In 2011, Bulgari signed a strategic alliance with LVMH Moet Hennessy Louis Vuitton SA, the world's leading luxury group. The agreement was based on a stock transfer of the Bulgari family's shares in Bulgari S.p.A. to LVMH, an all-share deal for €4.3 billion ($6.0 billion), higher than LVMH had offered for any other company. Under the deal, the Bulgari family sold their 50.4 per cent controlling stake in exchange for 3 per cent of LVMH, thereby becoming the second-biggest family shareholder behind the Arnaults in LVMH. The takeover doubled the size of LVMH's watches and jewellery unit, which at the time of the acquisition included Tag Heuer timepieces and De Beers diamond necklaces. The acquisition concluded on 4 October 2011 as Bulgari was delisted from the Borsa Italiana.

In 2014, Bulgari celebrated the 130th anniversary of the brand. To mark the occasion, the shop at Via Condotti 10 was "reimagined" by the architect Peter Marino, and reopened. On the same day, the brand donated €1.5 million to the city of Rome for the restoration of the Spanish Steps. A few months after the Grand Opening, the DOMVS was inaugurated in the redesigned Bulgari boutique, creating a gallery space to house of Bulgari's Heritage Collection.

In 2017, Bulgari opened a new jewellery manufacturing headquarters in Valenza. The facility was built over the former home of the first goldsmith in Valenza, Francesco Caramora. The buildings follow the model of a Roman domus, and are built around a central courtyard.

Products

Jewellery 
Bulgari's jewellery collections include B.zero1, Divas' Dream, Serpenti, BVLGARI BVLGARI, Parentesi, and a bridal line.

Watches 

Bulgari's watches collections include Octo, BVLGARI BVLGARI, Diagono and Haute Horlogerie creations for men, and LVCEA, Serpenti, Divas' Dream, BVLGARI BVLGARI, B.zero1 and High Jewellery timepieces for women. It mixes Italian design and Swiss watchmaking. The company's Swiss subsidiary, Bulgari Haute Horlogerie SA, is responsible for Bulgari's watch production. It was founded in 1980 and is headquartered in Neuchâtel. Bulgari Haute Horlogerie SA employs about 500 people.

Fragrances 

Fragrances include Goldea, Splendida and Omnia for women, BVLGARI Man, Aqua, the Classics, and Blv Pour Homme for men, whilst BVLGARI Le Gemme and Eau Parfumée.

Accessories and leather goods 
The creation of Bulgari accessories and leather goods is handled in the Bulgari atelier in Florence, and twice a year presents its collections at Milan Fashion Week.

Bulgari hotels and resorts 

In 2001, Bulgari formed a joint venture with The Ritz-Carlton Hotel Company, a hotel brand owned by Marriott International, to launch Bulgari Hotels & Resorts, a collection of hotels and resort destinations around the world.

Their distinctive settings and Italian design by the architectural firm Antonio Citterio-Patricia Viel characterise the properties of Bulgari Hotel Group. These are Milan (opened in 2004), Bali (2006), London (2012), Beijing (2017), Dubai (2017), Shanghai (2018) and Paris (2021). Hotels in Moscow, Rome, Tokyo, Miami Beach and Los Angeles are due to open between 2022 and 2025.

Accommodations

Historical

From 2015

Shops

Bulgari has about 300 stores. The largest is the 10-storey Bulgari Ginza Tower in Tokyo,  of retail floor space, including a restaurant and lounge bar.

North American Bulgari boutiques (41 in the US) and distributors are found in Bal Harbour, Beverly Hills, Cabo San Lucas, Chicago, Costa Mesa, Honolulu, Houston, King of Prussia, Las Vegas (4 stores), Los Angeles, New York, Mexico City, Montreal, Orlando, Palm Beach, San Antonio, San Francisco, Westfield Valley Fair, San Jose, California, San Juan, The Mall at Short Hills, Scottsdale, Toronto, Vail and Washington D.C.

South American Bulgari distributors are found in Bogotá, Lima, Margarita Island, Quito and São Paulo.

Partnership with Save the Children 
In 2009, Bulgari began a partnership with Save the Children, including a co-branded jewellery collection, of which a portion of the proceeds goes to the charity. As of 2018, Bulgari's contribution has totalled $80 million.

Bulgari Art Award
The Bulgari Art Award is an annual art award in partnership with the Art Gallery of New South Wales, Sydney, Australia. Sponsored by Bulgari, the $50,000 acquisitive cash award plus $30,000 residency in Italy is presented to mid-career Australian artists.

The winners include:

2012 – Michael Zavros
2013 – Jon Cattapan
2014 – Daniel Boyd
2015 – Ildiko Kovacs
2016 – Jude Rae
2017 – Tomislav Nikolić
2019 – Nusra Latif Qureshi

References

1884 establishments in Italy
Manufacturing companies of Italy
Companies based in Rome
Manufacturing companies established in 1884
Retail companies established in 1984
Fashion accessory brands
High fashion brands
Hospitality companies of Italy
Italian jewellers
Jewellery companies of Italy
Jewellery retailers of Italy
Luxury brands
Perfume houses
Watch brands
Watch manufacturing companies of Italy
Eyewear brands of Italy
LVMH brands